Major Felten, also "Felton" (March 19, 1904 – November 1975) was an American visual artist and illustrator, active in the 1930s-1950s. He became known for his dramatic posters and book illustrations. Some of his posters were published by Davis Blue Artwork, a company founded by Robert Blue and Brian Davis. He was born in Canaan, Connecticut and spent much of his life in Darien, Connecticut. His stark black and white illustrations for the Ives Washburn 1931 edition of Baudelaire's translated poems The Flowers of Evil are especially worth noting, as exemplars of art deco aesthetics.

Some images available online

American illustrators
American poster artists
1904 births
1975 deaths